inSSIDer is a Wi-Fi network scanner application for Microsoft Windows and OS X developed by MetaGeek, LLC.  It has received awards such as a 2008 Infoworld Bossie Award for "Best of Open Source Software in Networking", but as of inSSIDer 3, it is no longer open-source.

History
inSSIDer began as a replacement for NetStumbler, a popular Windows Wi-Fi scanner, which had not been actively developed for several years and reputedly did not work with modern 64-bit operating systems or versions of Windows higher than Windows XP. The project was inspired by Charles Putney on The Code Project.

Features
 New in Version 5.0: channel utilization break down to show device (AP and client) airtime utilization; see connected client devices and info about client such as utilization and signal strength
 Gathers information from wireless card and software
 Helps choose the best wireless channel available 
 Wi-Fi network information such as SSID, MAC, vendor, data rate, signal strength, and security
 Graphs signal strength over time
 Shows which Wi-Fi network channels overlap

System requirements

Windows
 Version 5.0: Microsoft Windows 7 or higher
 Version 3.0: Microsoft Windows XP SP3 or higher
 Version 2.1: Microsoft Windows XP SP2
 Microsoft .NET Framework 3.5 or higher

OS X
 OS X Mountain Lion 10.8 or higher

References

External links
 
  (Apache 2.0 license)

Wireless networking
MacOS network-related software
MacOS security software
Windows network-related software
Windows security software